Herbert John Green (1850/51 – 1918)  was an English architect who was born near Ipswich in the English county of Suffolk.

Profile 
He trained for the profession as a pupil under Sir Arthur Blomfield and worked from his offices once he was qualified. By 1881 he had progressed and had his own independent practice and had offices in Norwich and in Lincoln's Inn Fields in London. His works include the renovation of a large number of churches in Norfolk. He also designed the Grand Hotel on the North Norfolk coast in the town of Sheringham. He was the diocesan surveyor for the Anglican Diocese of Norwich from 1881 to 1898.

Bankruptcy 
In 1894 Green was judged bankrupt, but his work was continued and project references to him as an architect continue thereafter. He is recorded as living in the same house in Norwich from 1891 to 1901.

List of Works

England
 Shadwell Court, Brettenham, Norfolk (1900)
 Bank House, Cromer, Norfolk (1896)
 St. Margaret's Church, Fleggburgh, Norfolk
 Carnegie Library, King's Lynn, Norfolk (1904)
 Riddlesworth Hall, Riddlesworth, Norfolk (1900)
 The Esplanada, Sheringham, Norfolk
 The Grand Hotel, Sheringham, Norfolk (1898)
 Church of St. Peter and St. Paul, Shernborne, Norfolk (1898)
 Thetford Guildhall, Thetford, Norfolk

Gallery

References
Notes

Bibliography

Architects from Norfolk
English ecclesiastical architects
1850s births
1918 deaths